Firstborn (titled Moving In in Europe) is a 1984 drama film starring Teri Garr, Peter Weller, Corey Haim (in his film debut), Sarah Jessica Parker, Robert Downey Jr., and Christopher Collet. It was filmed in New Jersey and New York State. It was eventually released on DVD and Blu-ray on July 31, 2012.

Plot summary
Sixteen-year-old Jake Livingston has been the man of the Livingston home since his parents divorced two years earlier, that is, until his mother Wendy started seeing Sam. Sam, an alcoholic and drug addict, introduces Jake's mother to a self-destructive lifestyle.

Wendy cannot see beyond Sam's charms or her own emotional needs, and Jake's younger brother Brian succumbs to Sam's ingratiating manner. Jake resents Sam's constant presence in the household, however, especially when Sam begins to establish rules and discipline for the boys and expects them to obey.

Jake becomes aware of a drug deal of Sam's. He steals the drugs and hides them. Sam becomes verbally then physically violent with Jake, demanding the drugs be returned. Seeing this behavior, Wendy finally realizes that Jake was only protecting her and Brian, so she demands Sam leave. Sam starts beating Jake, then tries to beat Wendy. Jake stands up to Sam and demands that he leave, threatening to kill him if he ever comes back. Sam then leaves as the family holds each other. Wendy apologizes and thanks Jake for saving the family's lives.

Cast
 Teri Garr as Wendy Livingston
 Peter Weller as Sam
 Christopher Collet as Jake Livingston
 Corey Haim as Brian Livingston
 Sarah Jessica Parker as Lisa
 Robert Downey Jr. as Lee

Reception
Firstborn received mixed reviews from critics. On Rotten Tomatoes, the film holds a rating of 36% from 14 reviews.

References

External links
 
 
 
 

1984 films
1980s teen drama films
American teen drama films
Films directed by Michael Apted
Films scored by Michael Small
Films set in New Jersey
Films shot in New Jersey
Paramount Pictures films
1984 drama films
1980s English-language films
1980s American films